Undercovers is the debut studio album by the Serbian rock band Night Shift, released by PGP-RTS in 2002.

Track listing

Personnel

Night Shift
 Milan Šćepanović (guitar, vocals, producer)
 Danijel Šćepanović (drums)
 Marko Dacić (bass, vocals)

Additional personnel
 Mirko Vukomanović (producer)
 Ivana Pavlović (backing vocals)
 Dejan Cukić (backing vocals)

References

 EX YU ROCK enciklopedija 1960-2006, Janjatović Petar; 

Night Shift (band) albums
2002 debut albums
Covers albums
PGP-RTS albums